Karl Konstantin Albrecht Leonhard Graf von Blumenthal (30 July 1810 – 21 December 1900) was an officer of the Prussian Army and field marshal of the Imperial German Army, chiefly remembered for his decisive intervention at the Battle of Königgrätz in 1866, his victories at Wörth and Weißenburg, and above all his refusal to bombard Paris in 1870 during the siege, of which he was in command.

Early life

Born in Schwedt, Brandenburg, on 30 July 1810, Leonhard was the son of Ludwig Albrecht von Blumenthal (1774–1813) and his wife Friederike Charlotte Dorothea von Below (1783–1853). Ludwig was a captain in the Brandenburg Dragoon Regiment who was wounded in the Battle of Dennewitz, and later died from his injuries at Potsdam. Leonhard had a younger brother, Karl (1811-1903), who would later serve as a major-general in the army. 

Leonhard was brought up on his grandfather's estate at Reddentin, where his uncle Gustav von Below was founding what would become the Pentecostal movement. He was educated at the military schools of Culm and Berlin, entering the Guards as a 2nd lieutenant in 1827, and studied at the Berlin General War School (later called the Prussian Military Academy).

Military career 
After serving in the Rhine Province, von Blumenthal joined the topographical division of the general staff in 1846. As lieutenant of the 31st foot, he took part in 1848 in the suppression of the Berlin riots, and in 1849 was promoted captain on the general staff. The same year he served on the staff of General Eduard von Bonin in the First Schleswig War, and so distinguished himself, particularly at Fredericia, that he was appointed chief of the staff of the Schleswig-Holstein army, when the previous chief of staff, Captain von Delius, was killed.

In 1850, von Blumenthal was general staff officer of the mobile division under Tietzen in Hesse-Kassel. He was sent on a mission to England in that year (4th class of Red Eagle), and on several subsequent occasions. Having attained the rank of lieutenant-colonel, he was appointed personal adjutant to Prince Frederick Charles in 1859. In 1860 he became colonel of the 31st, and later of the 71st, regiment. He was chief of the staff of the III Corps when, on the outbreak of the Second Schleswig War of 1864, he was nominated chief of the general staff of the army against Denmark, and displayed so much ability, particularly at Dybbøl and the night attack on the island of Als, which he masterminded and which ended the war, that he was promoted to major-general and awarded the order Pour le Mérite.

In the Austro-Prussian War of 1866, von Blumenthal was Chief of Staff of the Second Army, commanded by the Crown Prince Frederick William. It was upon this army that the brunt of the fighting fell, and its arrival at Königgrätz saved the day. Von Blumenthal's own part in these battles and in the campaign generally was most conspicuous. At Königgrätz the crown prince said to him, "I know to whom I owe the conduct of my army", and von Blumenthal soon received promotion to lieutenant-general and the oak-leaves to the order Pour le Mérite. He was also made a knight of the Hohenzollern Order. From 1866 to 1870, he commanded the 14th Division at Düsseldorf.

In the Franco-Prussian War of 1870–71, von Blumenthal was chief of staff of the Third Army under the crown prince. Eighteen other members of his family also fought in this war, including both his sons and three nephews, of whom two were killed.  Von Blumenthal's soldierly qualities and talent were most conspicuous in the critical days preceding the battle of Sedan, and his services in the war have been considered as scarcely less valuable and important than those of Moltke himself. Bismarck said:  He directed the Siege of Paris and resisted calls to bombard it. He also directed the operations conducted by General von der Tann around Orleans, and defended the Grand Duke of Mecklenburg from interference by Moltke.

Von Blumenthal represented Germany at the British manoeuvres at Chobham in 1871, and was given the command of the IV Corps at Magdeburg. In 1873, he was promoted to general of the infantry, and ten years later he was given the title of Count. In 1888 he was made a general field marshal, after which he served as commander of the 4th and 3rd army inspections before eventually retiring in 1896.

In 1900, Kaiser Wilhelm II announced through the Court Circular that von Blumenthal would be made a Prince (Fürst). However, before this could be enacted the field marshal died that same year at Quellendorf near Köthen on 21 December. He was interred in the family crypt at Krampfer.

Legacy
He was noted (among others by the English journalist William Howard Russell who followed him during the Franco-Prussian War) for his kindliness and sense of humour. 

Like the Crown Prince, Moltke and other key Prussian leaders, he had an English wife, Delicia Vyner and it was widely thought in conservative circles that this was the basis of a liberal Prussian clique. His least appreciated but arguably most important work was the development of the doctrine of Fire and Infiltration, the basis of Blitzkrieg.

Titles, honours and awards
 Honorary Citizen of the City of Düsseldorf, 1871
 Fort No. XII of the Straßburg Fortress, a military barracks in Halle, and a colliery in Recklinghausen, named in his honour, 2 September 1873
 Honorary Member of the Swedish Academy of Sciences, 1 April 1876
 Granted the noble title of Count (Graf), 1883

Orders and decorations

Notes

References

Attribution

Further reading
Journals of Field Marshal Count von Blumenthal for 1866 and 1870–71, edited by his son, Count Albrecht von Blumenthal, translated by Major Gillespie-Addison, published by Edward Arnold, 1903.
Bismarck, Some Secret Pages of His History - the diary of Dr. Moritz Busch published by Macmillan & Co, 1898
The War Diary of Emperor Frederick III 1870–1871 translated and edited by A. R. Allinson, published by Stanley Paul & Co, 1927

External links 

 
Journals of Field-Marshal Count von Blumenthal for 1866 and 1870-71

1810 births
1900 deaths
People from Schwedt
Leonhard
Counts of Germany
Field marshals of the German Empire
Field marshals of Prussia
German military personnel of the Franco-Prussian War
Prussian people of the Austro-Prussian War
People of the First Schleswig War
Prussian military personnel of the Second Schleswig War
People from the Province of Brandenburg
Recipients of the Iron Cross (1870), 1st class
Recipients of the Pour le Mérite (military class)
Grand Crosses of the Order of Saint Stephen of Hungary
Commanders of the Military Order of Max Joseph
Grand Crosses of the Military Merit Order (Bavaria)
Commandeurs of the Légion d'honneur
Knights Grand Cross of the Order of Saints Maurice and Lazarus
Knights Grand Cross of the Military Order of Savoy
Recipients of the Military Merit Cross (Mecklenburg-Schwerin), 1st class
Recipients of the Order of St. George of the Fourth Degree
Commanders of the Order of the Sword
Military personnel from Brandenburg